Seif Farouk Gaafar (born 5 December 1999) is an Egyptian professional footballer who plays as a midfielder in Zamalek SC.

References

External links

 

Living people
Egyptian footballers
Egypt youth international footballers
Association football forwards
Zamalek SC players
Egyptian Premier League players
1999 births